George Gelnovatch (born February 12, 1965) is the men's soccer coach at the University of Virginia.  He played professionally in the Major Indoor Soccer League and American Professional Soccer League. As head coach, he has led Virginia men's soccer to the College Cup Final Four in 1997, 2006, 2009, 2013, 2014, and 2019. Under his leadership, Virginia won its sixth and seventh NCAA National Championships of the sport in 2009 and 2014.

Player
Gelnovatch grew up in Wall Township, New Jersey and played soccer at Wall High School, where he was part of three state champion teams.  He attended the University of Virginia, playing on the men's soccer team from 1983 to 1986.  He was a 1986 First Team All American.  He ranks fifth on the school's all time lists for points (118) and goals (49). During his career, the Cavaliers went 67–14–4. In 1986, he earned first team all-ACC and first team all-American honors.  In 1987, the Minnesota Strikers selected Gelnovatch in the fourth round of the Major Indoor Soccer League draft.  He spent one season with Minnesota.  In 1988, he moved to the New Jersey Eagles of the American Soccer League. In 1990, Gelnovatch joined the Penn-Jersey Spirit of the American Professional Soccer League.  He was a first team All League defender that season.  In April 1991, Gelnovatch moved to the Maryland Bays.  In 1996, he played a handful of games for D.C. United in Major League Soccer.

Coach
In 1989, Gelnovatch served as a part-time assistant coach under Bruce Arena with the Virginia Cavaliers.  In 1995, he became a full-time assistant at Virginia.  On January 3, 1996, Gelnovatch replaced Arena as head coach. He is most notable for leading the Cavaliers to the 2009 NCAA Division I Men's Soccer Championship where the Cavaliers won a penalty shoot-out against Akron. His teams have reached the NCAA tournament every year he's coached, except 2021. He has led the Cavaliers to three NCAA college cup appearances, four Atlantic Coast Conference tournament titles, and two Atlantic Coast Conference regular season titles.  In September 1999, Arena appointed Gelnovatch as the head coach of the United States U-18 men's national soccer team.  In 1999 and 2002, he also served as an assistant coach with the United States men's national soccer team.

Head coaching record

References

External links
 Virginia prolife
 MISL: George Gelnovatch

1965 births
Living people
American soccer coaches
American soccer players
American Professional Soccer League players
American Soccer League (1988–89) players
Association football defenders
D.C. United players
Major Indoor Soccer League (1978–1992) players
Major League Soccer players
Maryland Bays players
Minnesota Strikers (MISL) players
New Jersey Eagles players
Penn-Jersey Spirit players
United States men's under-20 international soccer players
Virginia Cavaliers men's soccer coaches
Virginia Cavaliers men's soccer players
All-American men's college soccer players
Wall High School (New Jersey) alumni
People from Wall Township, New Jersey
Sportspeople from Monmouth County, New Jersey
Soccer players from New Jersey